The 1975 Campeonato Paulista da Divisão Especial de Futebol Profissional was the 74th season of São Paulo's top professional football league. São Paulo won the championship by the 11th time. no teams were relegated.

Championship
The championship was divided into two rounds; in the first round, the eighteen teams all played against themselves once, with the team with the most points winning the round, and in the second round, the teams would be divided into two groups, with each team playing once against the teams of the other group. The three teams with the most points in each group qualify to a final hexagonal to define the champions of the round, and the winners of each round qualified to the finals. In the second round, the remaining twelve teams would all play against each other once, and the team with the most points would be champion.

First round

Second round

Group A

Group B

Second phase

Finals

|}

Top Scores

References

Campeonato Paulista seasons
Paulista